Byron Roger Wales (July 17, 1879 – November 25, 1929) was an American lawyer and politician from New York.

Life
He was born on July 17, 1879, in Binghamton, Broome County, New York. He graduated from Binghamton High School in 1898; and from Columbia Law School in 1901. He was City Judge of Binghamton from 1908 to 1911; and then Corporation Counsel of Binghamton. In 1923, he was elected Chairman of the Broome County Republican Committee.

Wales was a member of the New York State Senate (40th D.) from 1925 until his death in 1929, sitting in the 148th, 149th, 150th, 151st and 152nd New York State Legislatures. In 1927, he was appointed as a Special Deputy Attorney General to prosecute the Mayor of Amsterdam, and the D.A. and the Sheriff of Montgomery County.

He died on November 25, 1929, in Lourdes Hospital in Binghamton, New York, a week after an operation for cirrhosis; and was buried at the Floral Park Cemetery in Johnson City.

On May 29, 1930, his widow Alice C. Wales was appointed as Clerk of the Binghamton City Court.

References

External links
 

1879 births
1929 deaths
Republican Party New York (state) state senators
Politicians from Binghamton, New York
Deaths from cirrhosis
Columbia Law School alumni
New York (state) state court judges
Lawyers from Binghamton, New York
19th-century American lawyers